Chairs Missing is the second studio album by English rock band Wire. It was released on 8 September 1978 by Harvest Records. The album peaked at number 48 in the UK Albums Chart.

Although it features some of the minimalist punk rock of the band's debut Pink Flag, Chairs Missing contains more developed song structure (taking some cues from 1970s prog-rock, psychedelia, and art rock), keyboard and synthesizer elements brought in by producer Mike Thorne, and a broader palette of emotional and intellectual subject matter. The title is said to be a British slang term for a mildly disturbed person, as in "that guy has a few chairs missing in his front room". The single "Outdoor Miner" was a minor hit, peaking at number 51 in the UK Singles Chart.

Critical reception 

In a 1979 Trouser Press review, Jim Green said, "Wire are disconcerting, laconic yet eloquent in fragmented visions, jarring even at their most accessible. They disdain cliche, pushing out the limits of rock; the easy way is too boring." He continued, "Their stripped-down rhythms take on the quality of being familiar yet somehow alien, just as their bleak lyrics lift the everyday from its context and illuminate its ironies." Green concluded that "[y]ou have to listen for yourself."

In their retrospective review, Steve Huey of AllMusic gave the album five stars out of five and wrote "The arty darkness of Chairs Missing, combined with the often icy-sounding synth/guitar arrangements, helps make the record a crucial landmark in the evolution of punk into post-punk and goth, as well as a testament to Wire's rapid development and inventiveness." BBC Music called the album a "glorious avant-pop coup" and (referring to the 2006 edition of the album) "the most satisfying of the three reissues [the others being Pink Flag and 154]." In 2004 Pitchfork listed Chairs Missing as 33rd best album of the 1970s. In 2013 NME listed the album as the 394th greatest album of all time.

Legacy
In 2004 the US record label Words-on-Music released A Houseguest's Wish, a CD tribute album to the band consisting solely of 19 different versions of the Chairs Missing track "Outdoor Miner".

Track listing 
Credits adapted from the 2018 Special Edition.

All music written by Colin Newman, except where noted. All lyrics written by Graham Lewis, except where noted.

*The bonus tracks on the 1989 and 1994 reissues were removed from the 2006 remastered reissue because they, according to the band, didn't honour the "conceptual clarity of the original statements".

2018 Special Edition

Personnel 
Credits adapted from the liner notes of the 2018 Special Edition.
 Wire
 Colin Newman – vocals, guitar, backing vocals, arrangement
 Bruce Gilbert – guitar, arrangement, concept
 Graham Lewis – bass, vocals on "Sand in My Joints", backing vocals, arrangement, concept, original sleeve design
 Robert Gotobed – drums, percussion, arrangement

 Additional personnel and production
 Kathryn Lukas – flute on "Heartbeat"
 Mike Thorne – production, keyboards, synthesizers, backing vocals on "Being Sucked in Again", arrangement
 Paul Hardiman – engineering 
 Ken Thomas – assistant engineering
 Annette Green – photography
 Brian Palmer – art direction
 Tim Chacksfield – project co-ordination (1994 reissue)
 Phil Smee – packaging (1994 reissue)
 Chris Blair – cutting engineering (1994 reissue)
 Andrew Day – design (2006 reissue)
 Denis Blackham – Remastering (2006 and 2018 reissues)
 Nick Glennie-Smith – engineering (disc 3, 2018 reissue)
 Jon Wozencroft – art direction, layout (2018 reissue)
 HQ – layout (2018 reissue)
 Malka Spigel-Newman – photo restoration (2018 reissue)
 Jon Savage – liner notes (2018 reissue)
 Graham Duff – liner notes (2018 reissue)
 Craig Grannell – booklet editor (2018 reissue)

References

Informational notes

External links 
 
 
 The making of Wire's Chairs Missing album

1978 albums
Harvest Records albums
Restless Records albums
Wire (band) albums
Albums produced by Mike Thorne
Avant-pop albums